is a railway station located in Ibusuki, Kagoshima, Japan.
The station opened in 1934.

Lines 
Kyushu Railway Company
Ibusuki Makurazaki Line

JR

Adjacent stations

Nearby places
Ibusuki City Commercial High School
Ibusuki City Office Imaizumi Branch
Imaizumi Post Office

Railway stations in Kagoshima Prefecture
Railway stations in Japan opened in 1934
Ibusuki, Kagoshima